The Australian National Committee on Large Dams (abbreviated as ANCOLD) is an Australian-based non-government, non-profit and voluntary association of organisations and individual professionals with a common technical interest in large dams and their environs. ANCOLD is not an advocate for dams but an apolitical industry body that focuses on disseminating knowledge, developing capability and providing guidance on all aspects of dam engineering, management and associated issues.

ANCOLD is a member of the International Commission on Large Dams (or ICOLD).

Role and functions
ANCOLD maintains a register of large dams in Australia, of which approximately 490 dams were listed on the register in 1999.

The association awards scholarships to young professionals to attend the annual ANCOLD conference.

Publications
Publications include a quarterly newsletter, and:

 Guidelines on design floods for dams - 1986
 Register of large dams in Australia - 1990
 Status of dam safety in Australia - 1990
 Guidelines on dam safety management - 1994
 Guidelines on risk assessment - 1994
 Guidelines on design of dams for earthquakes - 1998
 Dam technology in Australia 1850-1999 - 2000

References

Dam-related organizations
Non-profit organisations based in Tasmania
Dams in Australia